This article lists the winners and nominees for the NAACP Image Award for Outstanding News/Information – Series or Special. Originally entitled Outstanding News, Talk or Information, the award was later split to honor series' and specials separately. The categories were merged back together following the 2003 ceremony, before a separate category for talk series' was created in 2008 and the category was renamed to its current title.

Winners and nominees
Winners are listed first and highlighted in bold.

1980s

1990s

2000s

2010s

2020s

Multiple wins and nominations

Wins

 7 wins
 Unsung

 4 wins
 The Oprah Winfrey Show

 3 wins
 Tavis Smiley

 2 wins
 In Conversation

Nominations

 10 nominations
 Unsung

 7 nominations
 Judge Mathis

 5 nominations
 The Oprah Winfrey Show

 3 nominations
 Anderson Cooper 360°
 Biography
 Real Sports with Bryant Gumbel
 Tavis Smiley
 Washington Watch with Roland Martin

 2 nominations
 American Experience
 American Gangster
 Anderson Cooper 360°
 In Conversation
 Oprah: Where Are They Now?
 The Tyra Banks Show

References

NAACP Image Awards